The 1957 Marquette Warriors football team was an American football team that represented Marquette University as an independent during the 1957 NCAA University Division football season. In its second season under head coach John F. Druze, the team compiled a 0–10 record and was outscored by a total of 237 to 68. The 1957 season was part of a 20-game losing streak that began in November 1955 and continued through the end of the 1957 season.

The team played its home games at Marquette Stadium (one game) and County Stadium (four games) in Milwaukee. The move to County Stadium, combined with a losing record, saw attendance drop to 5,953 and 4,719 for the final two home games against Pacific and Penn State.

Schedule

References

Marquette
Marquette Golden Avalanche football seasons
College football winless seasons
Marquette Warriors football